Don't Give Up is the first collaborative studio album by Serengeti & Polyphonic. It was released on Audio 8 Recordings in 2007.

Critical reception

Jason Randall Smith of Impose said: "Musically ahead of its time while lyrically speaking in real time, Serengeti & Polyphonic have created an album that will likely get better with age." Jesse Serwer of XLR8R praised Polyphonic's production, saying: "With nods to microhouse, drum & bass, dub, and ambient sounds, Polyphonic's beats have an entirely unique, otherworldly feel to them."

Ben Westhoff of Washington City Paper placed it at number 6 on the "Top Ten Albums of 2007" list. Quentin B. Huff of PopMatters placed it at number 20 on the "101 Hip-Hop Albums of 2007" list.

Track listing

References

External links
 

2007 albums
Serengeti (rapper) albums
Collaborative albums